Bolman is a settlement in the region of Baranja, Croatia. 

Bolman may also refer to:

 Bolmån, a river in Sweden
 John Bolman (1751–1833), physician, surgeon, and political figure in Nova Scotia
 Marloes Bolman (born 1977), Dutch rower

See also
 Bollman, surname